Nanny McPhee and the Big Bang (released in the United States and Canada as Nanny McPhee Returns) is a 2010 period fantasy comedy film directed by Susanna White, produced by Tim Bevan, Eric Fellner and Lindsay Doran with music by James Newton Howard and co-produced by StudioCanal, Relativity Media, Working Title Films and Three Strange Angels. It is a sequel to the 2005 film Nanny McPhee. It was adapted by Emma Thompson from Christianna Brand's Nurse Matilda books. Thompson reprises her role as Nanny McPhee, and the film also stars Maggie Gyllenhaal, Ralph Fiennes, Rhys Ifans, Ewan McGregor, Asa Butterfield and Maggie Smith. The film was theatrically released on 20 August 2010 by Universal Pictures.

The film received positive reviews from critics and it earned $93.2 million on a $35 million budget. It also received a Young Artist Award nomination for Best Performance in a Feature Film. The film was released on DVD and Blu-ray in the UK on 19 June 2010.

Plot

Isabel Green is driven to her wit's end by her hectic life while her husband Rory fights in World War II. Between trying to keep the family farm up and running and her job in the village shop, run by the slightly mad Mrs. Docherty, she also has three boisterous children to look after, Norman, Megsie and Vincent. When her children's two wealthy, but pompous and snobby city cousins, Cyril and Celia, are evacuated to live with them in the countryside, they start fighting with them, only adding to Isabel's problems.

When the magical Nanny McPhee arrives to help, the children at first do not listen and carry on fighting, which she soon puts a stop to with her magic. Meanwhile, Isabel's brother-in-law Phil has gambled away his half of the farm, and is being chased by two hired female assassins working for casino owner Mrs. Biggles. He desperately attempts to make Isabel sell her half of the farm, using mean and spiteful schemes to leave her no choice; one of the schemes, setting loose a litter of piglets to be sold to a neighbouring farmer, is discovered by the children, leading them to bond as they work together to fix it. Isabel takes everyone on a picnic as a show of thanks, during which Mrs. Docherty's ARP Warden husband warns them about bombs and relates how he imagines a pilot might accidentally release one, and Phil subsequently delivers a telegram saying Rory was killed in action. Everyone believes the news except Norman, who is sure his father is alive because he "can feel it in [his] bones". He tells this to Cyril, who at first thinks he is just upset, but then agrees that Norman might be right; the two convince Nanny McPhee to take them to the War Office in London, where Cyril and Celia's father Lord Gray holds an important position, believing he will know the truth.

At first Lord Gray sneers at Norman's disbelief at his father's death, but after Cyril reveals that he knows he is divorcing their mother and blasts him for his neglect as a parent, Lord Gray investigates what has happened. While he is gone, Norman asks Cyril where he will live following the divorce; upon learning he rarely sees either of his parents, he says that he and Celia are welcome to live permanently with the Greens. Lord Gray returns and tells Norman that his father is merely missing in action, and that there is no record of a telegram being sent to his mother. After the boys leave, Norman deduces that Phil forged the telegram.

While the older boys are at the War Office, Megsie, Celia and Vincent try to stop Isabel from signing Phil's papers and selling the farm. Just as she is about to finally do so, a German pilot accidentally drops a huge bomb on the Greens' barley field; it does not explode, but the fallout is strong enough to cover Phil's papers with ink. When Nanny McPhee, Norman and Cyril return, Phil admits to Norman's accusation of forgery and is handcuffed to the stove by Isabel. The children go out to watch Mr. Docherty defuse the bomb, but when he faints, Megsie takes over, succeeding with the help of the other children and Nanny McPhee's jackdaw friend Mr. Edelweiss. Nanny McPhee helps to harvest the barley with a little magic, saving Phil from Mrs. Biggles' hitwomen in the process. While everyone celebrates, Mrs. Docherty is revealed to be baby Agatha from the first film and to remember Nanny McPhee, who has been staying with her. As Nanny McPhee walks away from the now-happy Isabel and the children, they chase after her, only to see Rory, with an injured arm, making his way back to them. He runs to his family and they embrace.

In a mid-credits scene, Ellie, an elephant conjured by Nanny McPhee to share Vincent's bed, is seen enjoying the magically operated Scratch-o-matic invented for the piglets.

Cast
 Emma Thompson as Nanny McPhee, the  nanny who changes the lives of the Green and Gray children.
 Maggie Gyllenhaal as Isabel Green (née Carrington), the frazzled mother of Norman, Megsie and Vincent.
 Rhys Ifans as Phil Green, Norman, Megsie and Vincent's uncle, Rory's brother and Isabel's brother-in-law, who tries to sell the farm because he gambled it away at a casino.
 Asa Butterfield as Norman Green, the eldest of the Green children.
 Lil Woods as Megan “Megsie” Green, the middle and only girl of the Green children.
 Oscar Steer as Vincent Green, the youngest of the Green children.
 Eros Vlahos as Cyril Gray, the spoiled cousin of Norman, Megsie and Vincent. He becomes kinder throughout the film and makes friends with Norman.
 Rosie Taylor-Ritson as Celia Gray, the other spoiled cousin of Norman, Megsie and Vincent. She also becomes kinder throughout the film and makes friends with Megsie.
 Maggie Smith as Agatha Rose Docherty (née Brown), the owner of the shop at which Mrs. Green works. She's baby Aggie from the first film grown up.
 Ewan McGregor as Rory Green, Isabel's husband, Phil's brother and the father of the Greens, away fighting in World War II.
 Ralph Fiennes as Lord Gray, Cyril and Celia's father, a General very high up in the War Office.
 Sam Kelly as Mr. Algernon Docherty, Mrs. Docherty's husband, who's an ARP (Air Raid Precautions) Warden.
 Sinead Matthews as Miss Topsey, a henchwoman of Mrs. Biggles, the woman who owns the casino at which Phil gambled the farm away.
 Katy Brand as Miss Turvey, the colleague of Miss Topsey.
 Bill Bailey as Farmer MacReadie, the farmer who buys the piglets from the Greens.
 Nonso Anozie as Sergeant Ralph Jeffreys - the guard at the War Office, and a former charge of Nanny McPhee.
 Daniel Mays as Blenkinsop - Cyril and Celia's chauffeur.
 Ed Stoppard as Lieutenant Addis, a coworker of Lord Gray.
 Toby Sedgwick as an enemy plane pilot.

Production

Filming locations

The village in the film is Hambleden in Buckinghamshire, the farm set and scenes were filmed in Hascombe, near Godalming in Surrey and the War Office scenes, both interior and exterior, were filmed at the University of London, and the motorbike scenes on various London roads.
Dunsfold Aerodrome, the location of Top Gear, name Nanny McPhee and the Big Bang as being filmed there, with more filming taking place at Shepperton Studios.

Release

Theatrical
Nanny McPhee and the Big Bang was theatrically released on 20 August 2010 by Universal Pictures (2 April 2010 in the UK).

Home media
The film was released on DVD and Blu-ray in the UK on 19 June 2010. Nanny McPhee Returns, as the film was renamed for the North American market, was released on DVD and Blu-ray on 14 December 2010.

Other media
Emma Thomson wrote a novelization of the movie. Thomson narrated its audiobook and included a behind-the-scenes diary. Thomson won the Audie Award for Narration by the Author and was nominated for an Audie Award for Middle Grade Title and a Grammy Award for Best Spoken Word Album for Children for her narration

Reception

Critical response

Critical response for the film was positive. Review aggregation website Rotten Tomatoes gave the film a rating of 75% based on 121 reviews. The site's critic consensus reads: "Emma Thompson's second labor of love with the Nanny McPhee character actually improves on the first, delivering charming family fare with an excellent cast." Metacritic calculated an average score of 52 out of 100 based on 25 reviews, indicating "mixed or average reviews". Audiences polled by CinemaScore gave the film an average grade of "A-" on an A+ to F scale. The Independent also gave a favourable review, with praise given to the actors and Thompson's script."

Box office
In the UK, the film opened at number one, with £2,586,760, outperforming new release The Blind Side, grossing a total of £16,211,057. In the United States and Canada, it debuted in seventh position with a $8.4 million. Gross exceeded $27 million.

Awards

Cancelled sequel
A third film, to be set in 21st-century England, was planned, but the sequel did not meet studio expectations and plans for any future films were cancelled.

References

External links

 
 
 

2010 directorial debut films
2010 films
2010s children's fantasy films
2010 fantasy films
American fantasy comedy films
American sequel films
British fantasy comedy films
British sequel films
Fiction about child care occupations
2010s English-language films
2010s fantasy comedy films
Films about families
Films about witchcraft
Films based on children's books
Films produced by Eric Fellner
Films produced by Tim Bevan
Films scored by James Newton Howard
Films set in 1943
Films set in England
Films set in London
Films shot in Buckinghamshire
Films shot in London
Films shot in Surrey
Films with screenplays by Emma Thompson
Films about nannies
Relativity Media films
StudioCanal films
Universal Pictures films
Working Title Films films
American World War II films
British World War II films
French World War II films
2010s historical comedy films
British historical comedy films
American historical comedy films
Films directed by Susanna White
2010s American films
2010s British films